Kári Reynheim (born 15 February 1964) is a former Faroese football striker. He is currently the manager of ÍF Fuglafjarðar.

Club career
A fine dribbler boasting a powerful shot, Reynheim played semi-professionally in Norway. Also, he played 110 matches, scoring 32 goals in all competitions for HB Tórshavn and he played for B36 Tórshavn.

International career
Reynheim made his debut in an August 1988 friendly match against Iceland, the country's first FIFA-recognized match. He earned 27 caps and 2 goals between 1988 and 1995. His last international was a November 1995 European Championship qualifying match against Greece.

International goals
Scores and results list Faroe Islands' goal tally first.

References

External links
Kari Reynheim at Footballdatabase

1964 births
Living people
Faroese footballers
Faroe Islands international footballers
Faroese football managers
B71 Sandoy players
Havnar Bóltfelag players
B36 Tórshavn players
Faroese expatriate footballers
Expatriate footballers in Norway
Faroese expatriate sportspeople in Norway
Argja Bóltfelag managers
NSÍ Runavík managers
Association football forwards